Joseph William McGonagle, Jr., is a member of the Massachusetts House of Representatives.

A resident of Everett, Massachusetts, he was elected as a Democrat to represent the House of Representatives' 28th Middlesex district.

McGonagle is a former Everett city councillor.

See also
 2019–2020 Massachusetts legislature
 2021–2022 Massachusetts legislature

References

Democratic Party members of the Massachusetts House of Representatives
Politicians from Everett, Massachusetts
Living people
Massachusetts city council members
21st-century American politicians
Year of birth missing (living people)